Most Beautiful Model in Nigeria, also abbreviated as MBMN, is a beauty pageant that was created in Nigeria in 2015 by Alex Nwankwo.

History
The pageant started in Abuja, Nigeria in 2015. Jennifer Obi from Anambra State was crowned the first Most Beautiful Model in Nigeria. In 2016, during the second edition, Yvette Meurer from Delta State was crowned as the winner. In 2018, during the third edition, Favour Umeike was crowned as the winner.

Titleholders

References

Beauty pageants for people of specific ethnic or national descents
Recurring events established in 2015
2015 establishments in Nigeria